Ronald Michael Segal (14 July 1932 – 23 February 2008) was a South African activist, writer and editor, founder of the anti-apartheid magazine Africa South and the Penguin African Library.

Life
Ronald Segal was born on 14 July 1932, into a rich South African Jewish family. He was educated at Sea Point Boys' High School. After failing to gain entry to Oxford University, he studied at Cape Town University and then Trinity College, Cambridge. Returning to South Africa in 1956, he founded the anti-apartheid magazine Africa South. After the 1960 Sharpeville Massacre he went into exile with Oliver Tambo, and settled in England, continuing his anti-apartheid political activity and pursuing activity as a writer. Segal's best-known work is The State of the World Atlas (first edition, 1981), which he co-founded with Michael Kidron, another South African-born Jew, who shared most of his political views.

After Segal was unbanned from South Africa, he visited the country several times, receiving a hero’s welcome on stage alongside Mandela, Tambo and Slovo in 1992. He died on 23 February 2008.

Works
 Tokolosh of the Townships, 1960 [3]
 Political Africa: A Who’s Who of Personalities and Parties, 1961
 African Profiles, 1962
 Into Exile, 1963
 Sanctions against South Africa, 1964
 The Anguish of India, 1965
 The Race War: The Worldwide Conflict of Races, 1966
 America’s Receding Future
 The Americans: A Conflict of Creed and Reality, 1969
 The Struggle Against History, 1971
 Whose Jerusalem? The Conflicts of Israel, 1973
 Decline and Fall of the American Dollar, 1974
 Southern Africa: New Politics of Revolution, 1976
 Leon Trotsky: a biography, 1979
 (with Michael Kidron) The State of the World Atlas, 1981
 The Black Diaspora, 1995
 Islam's Black Slaves: The Other Black Diaspora, 2001

References

1932 births
2008 deaths
Alumni of Trinity College, Cambridge
Jewish South African anti-apartheid activists
White South African anti-apartheid activists
South African magazine editors
South African editors
South African non-fiction writers
South African emigrants to the United Kingdom
Alumni of Sea Point High School